Reynaldo Antonio Tilguath Flores (born 4 August 1979 in Tegucigalpa, Honduras) is a Former Honduran footballer who last played with Social Deportivo Vida

Club career
Nicknamed el Chino, Tilguath spent the whole of his career at Olimpia, except for a season at city rivals F.C. Motagua and a short spell at Platense. He returned to Olimpia from Motagua citing never to play for Motagua anymore after a fight with Motagua president Pedro Atala.

International career
Tilguath participated in the 1999 FIFA World Youth Championship in Nigeria. He made his senior debut for Honduras in an April 2003 friendly match against Paraguay, in which he came on as a late sub for Edgar Álvarez. The match proved to be his only international game ever.

References

External links

1979 births
Living people
Sportspeople from Tegucigalpa
Association football midfielders
Honduran footballers
Honduras international footballers
C.D. Olimpia players
Platense F.C. players
F.C. Motagua players
Liga Nacional de Fútbol Profesional de Honduras players